This is a list of songs in the Karaoke Revolution games, which are developed by Harmonix and Blitz Games and published by Konami.

Song lists – North America
Note: These songlists include the names of the artists who most famously recorded the song. The songs as they appear in the game are covers, with the exceptions being the song "Dance Like There's No Tomorrow", which is the master recording of the Paula Abdul song, and 10 original Mowtown songs in the Xbox version of Karaoke Revolution

Karaoke Revolution (NTSC)
Note: Italics denotes a "locked" song, requiring certain requirements to be met in order to be accessed.

 "Addicted" – Simple Plan
 "All You Wanted" – Michelle Branch
 "Are You Happy Now?" – Michelle Branch
 "Believe" – Cher
 "Billie Jean" – Michael Jackson
 "Bizarre Love Triangle" – New Order
 "Broken Wings" – Mr. Mister
 "Celebration" – Kool & the Gang
 "Chain of Fools" – Aretha Franklin
 "Complicated" – Avril Lavigne
 "Crawling in the Dark" – Hoobastank
 "Don't Know Why" – Norah Jones
 "Every Morning" – Sugar Ray
 "Everything You Want" – Vertical Horizon
 "Girls Just Want To Have Fun" – Cyndi Lauper
 "Hey Everybody" – Jennifer Love Hewitt*
 "Hey Jealousy" – Gin Blossoms
 "Hit Me With Your Best Shot" – Pat Benatar
 "How You Remind Me" – Nickelback
 "I'm Coming Out" – Diana Ross
 "It's the End of the World as We Know It (and I Feel Fine)" – R.E.M.
 "Kiss Me" – Sixpence None the Richer
 "Ladies' Night" – Kool & the Gang
 "Like a Virgin" – Madonna
 "One Week" – Barenaked Ladies
 "Red Red Wine" – UB40
 "Save Tonight" – Eagle-Eye Cherry
 "Science Genius Girl" – Freezepop
 "She Talks to Angels" – Black Crowes
 "Smooth Criminal" – Alien Ant Farm
 "Son of a Preacher Man" – Dusty Springfield
 "The Power of Love" – Huey Lewis and the News
 "Waiting for Tonight" – Jennifer Lopez
 "When a Man Loves a Woman" – Percy Sledge
 "Wind Beneath My Wings" – Bette Midler
 "You Really Got Me" – Van Halen
 "You're the One That I Want" – John Travolta and Olivia Newton-John

 Removed from final game

Karaoke Revolution Volume 2 – PS2 Only (NTSC)
Note: Italics denotes a "locked" song, requiring certain requirements to be met in order to be accessed.

 "...Baby One More Time" – Britney Spears
 "Born to Be Wild" – Steppenwolf
 "Cry" – Faith Hill
 "Drift Away" – Uncle Kracker
 "Every Breath You Take" – The Police
 "Friends in Low Places" – Garth Brooks
 "Genie in a Bottle" – Christina Aguilera
 "Heartbreak Hotel" – Elvis Presley
 "Here Without You" – 3 Doors Down
 "Hot Stuff" – Donna Summer
 "I Believe in a Thing Called Love" – The Darkness
 "I Hate (Everything About You)" – Three Days Grace
 "I Will Survive" – Gloria Gaynor
 "Irresistible" – Jessica Simpson
 "It's My Life" – No Doubt
 "I'll Make Love to You" – Boyz II Men
 "I'm with You" – Avril Lavigne
 "I've Got You Under My Skin" – Frank Sinatra
 "Jessie's Girl" – Rick Springfield
 "Lady Marmalade" – Patti LaBelle
 "Let's Get It On" – Marvin Gaye
 "Miss You" – Aaliyah
 "My Girl" – The Temptations
 "Papa Don't Preach" – Madonna
 "Perfect" – Simple Plan
 "Rich Girl" – Hall & Oates
 "Rock and Roll All Nite" – KISS
 "(Sittin' on) the Dock of the Bay" – Otis Redding
 "Sweet Home Alabama" – Lynyrd Skynyrd
 "The First Cut Is the Deepest" – Sheryl Crow
 "The Joker" – Steve Miller Band
 "Toxic" – Britney Spears
 "Virtual Insanity" – Jamiroquai
 "We Are Family" – Sister Sledge
 "White Flag" – Dido

Karaoke Revolution Volume 3 – PS2 Only (NTSC)
Note: Italics denotes a "locked" song, requiring certain requirements to be met in order to be accessed.

 "ABC" – The Jackson 5
 "Against All Odds (Take a Look at Me Now)" – Phil Collins
 "Ain't No Mountain High Enough" – Marvin Gaye & Tammi Terrell
 "Beat It" – Michael Jackson
 "Burn" – Usher
 "California Dreamin'" – The Mamas & the Papas
 "Careless Whisper" – George Michael
 "China Grove" – The Doobie Brothers
 "Come Clean" – Hilary Duff
 "Don't You (Forget About Me)" – Simple Minds
 "Flashdance... What a Feeling" – Irene Cara
 "Hold On" – Good Charlotte
 "I Got You Babe" – Sonny & Cher
 "If I Ain't Got You" – Alicia Keys
 "In the Midnight Hour" – Wilson Pickett
 "Joy to the World" – Three Dog Night
 "The Ketchup Song" – Las Ketchup
 "Killing Me Softly" – The Fugees
 "Leave (Get Out)" – JoJo
 "Love Shack" – The B-52's
 "Meant to Live" – Switchfoot
 "My Immortal" – Evanescence
 "New York, New York" – Frank Sinatra
 "Oops!... I Did It Again" – Britney Spears
 "Respect" – Aretha Franklin
 "Shining Star" – Earth, Wind & Fire
 "Snake Eater" (from Metal Gear Solid 3: Snake Eater) – Norihiko Hibino feat. Cynthia Harrell
 "Someday" – Nickelback
 "Take My Breath Away" – Berlin
 "Thank You" – Dido
 "The Reason" – Hoobastank
 "Twist and Shout" – The Beatles
 "Unchained Melody" – The Righteous Brothers
 "Under Pressure" – Queen feat. David Bowie
 "Waiting For You" (from Silent Hill 4: The Room) – Akira Yamaoka feat. Mary Elizabeth McGlynn
 "When I'm Gone" – Three Doors Down
 "Why Can't I?" – Liz Phair
 "You're the One That I Want" – Olivia Newton-John feat. John Travolta

Karaoke Revolution Party (NTSC) (the same as Karaoke Stage 2 in Europe) (also on Xbox and Gamecube)
Note: Italics denotes a "locked" song, requiring certain requirements to be met in order to be accessed.

This title is also available, with an identical song selection, on Xbox and Gamecube.

 "(I've Had) The Time of My Life" – Bill Medley and Jennifer Warnes
 "(You Make Me Feel Like) A Natural Woman" – Aretha Franklin
 "Ain't Nothing Like the Real Thing" – Marvin Gaye and Tammi Terrell
 "Ain't Too Proud to Beg" – The Temptations
 "Always" – Atlantic Starr
 "American Woman" – Lenny Kravitz
 "Brick House" – The Commodores
 "Call Me" – Blondie
 "Crazy" – Aerosmith
 "Crazy in Love" – Beyoncé and Jay-Z
 "Do You Really Want to Hurt Me?" – Culture Club
 "Drive" – Incubus
 "Dust in the Wind" – Kansas
 "Endless Love" – Diana Ross and Lionel Richie
 "Every Little Thing She Does Is Magic" – The Police
 "Everybody Wants to Rule the World" – Tears for Fears
 "Everywhere" – Michelle Branch
 "Fame" – Irene Cara
 "Fly" – Hilary Duff
 "For You I Will" – Monica
 "Greatest Love of All" – Whitney Houston
 "Headstrong" – Trapt
 "Here I Go Again" – Whitesnake
 "I Don't Want to Be" – Gavin DeGraw
 "I Left My Heart in San Francisco" – Tony Bennett
 "I Love Rock 'N Roll" – Joan Jett and the Blackhearts
 "I Will Always Love You" – Whitney Houston
 "If You Could Only See" – Tonic
 "I'll Be" – Edwin McCain
 "Material Girl" – Madonna
 "Me and Bobby McGee" – Janis Joplin
 "Pain" – Jimmy Eat World
 "Pieces of Me" – Ashlee Simpson
 "Play That Funky Music" – Wild Cherry
 "Start Me Up" – The Rolling Stones
 "Superstition" – Stevie Wonder
 "Sweet Caroline" – Neil Diamond
 "Take On Me" – a-ha
 "Takin' Care of Business" – Bachman-Turner Overdrive
 "That's Amore" – Dean Martin
 "The Game of Love"  – Santana featuring Michelle Branch
 "Time After Time" – Cyndi Lauper
 "Truth Is" – Fantasia
 "Turn the Beat Around" – Gloria Estefan
 "Unforgettable" – Nat King Cole with Natalie Cole (duet version)
 "Uptown Girl" – Billy Joel
 "Waiting for a Girl Like You" – Foreigner
 "What I Like About You" – The Romantics
 "Who Can It Be Now?" – Men at Work
 "You're My Best Friend" – Queen

CMT presents Karaoke Revolution Country (NTSC)
Note: Italics denotes a "locked" song, requiring certain requirements to be met in order to be accessed.

 "9 to 5" – Dolly Parton
 "All My Ex's Live in Texas" – George Strait
 "As Good As I Once Was" – Toby Keith
 "Boot Scootin' Boogie" – Brooks & Dunn
 "Celebrity" – Brad Paisley
 "Chattahoochee" – Alan Jackson
 "Crazy" – Patsy Cline
 "Does He Love You" – Reba McEntire & Linda Davis
 "Don't Worry 'Bout a Thing" – SHeDAISY
 "Friends in Low Places" – Garth Brooks
 "The Gambler" – Kenny Rogers
 "Gone" – Montgomery Gentry
 "Goodbye Earl" – Dixie Chicks
 "Good Ol' Boys" (Theme song from the television series The Dukes Of Hazzard) – Waylon Jennings
 "Hot Mama" – Trace Adkins
 "How Do I Live" – LeAnn Rimes
 "I Like It, I Love It" – Tim McGraw
 "I'm Movin' On" – Rascal Flatts
 "Independence Day" – Martina McBride
 "It's a Great Day to Be Alive" – Travis Tritt
 "It's Five O'Clock Somewhere" – Alan Jackson & Jimmy Buffett
 "It's Your Love" – Tim McGraw & Faith Hill
 "I Walk the Line" – Johnny Cash
 "Mammas Don't Let Your Babies Grow up to Be Cowboys" – Waylon Jennings & Willie Nelson
 "Mud on the Tires" – Brad Paisley
 "My Give a Damn's Busted" – Jo Dee Messina
 "On The Road Again" – Willie Nelson
 "Redneck Woman" – Gretchen Wilson
 "Save a Horse (Ride a Cowboy)" – Big & Rich
 "She Thinks My Tractor's Sexy" – Kenny Chesney
 "Stand By Your Man" – Tammy Wynette
 "Suds in the Bucket" – Sara Evans
 "What Was I Thinkin'" – Dierks Bentley
 "When the Sun Goes Down" – Kenny Chesney & Uncle Kracker
 "Wide Open Spaces" – Dixie Chicks

Glee: Karaoke Revolution
 "And I Am Telling You I'm Not Going" – Dreamgirls
 "Bust a Move" – Young MC
 "Can't Fight This Feeling" – REO Speedwagon
 "Defying Gravity" – Wicked
 "Don't Rain on My Parade" – Funny Girl
 "Don't Stand So Close to Me/Young Girl" – The Police/Gary Puckett & The Union Gap
 "Don't Stop Believin'" – Journey
 "Endless Love" – Diana Ross and Lionel Richie
 "Gold Digger" – Kanye West featuring Jamie Foxx
 "Hair/Crazy in Love" – Hair/Beyoncé Knowles and Jay-Z
 "Hate on Me" – Jill Scott
 "I Say a Little Prayer" – Dionne Warwick
 "I'll Stand by You" – The Pretenders
 "Imagine" – John Lennon
 "Keep Holding On" – Avril Lavigne
 "Lean on Me" – Bill Withers
 "Leaving on a Jet Plane" – Peter, Paul and Mary
 "My Life Would Suck Without You" – Kelly Clarkson
 "No Air" – Jordin Sparks and Chris Brown
 "Papa Don't Preach" – Madonna
 "Proud Mary" – Ike and Tina Turner
 "Push It" – Salt-n-Pepa
 "Smile" – Charlie Chaplin
 "Smile" – Lily Allen
 "Somebody to Love" – Queen
 "Sweet Caroline" – Neil Diamond
 "Taking Chances" – Celine Dion
 "True Colors" – Cyndi Lauper
 "You Can't Always Get What You Want" – The Rolling Stones

Glee Karaoke Revolution: Volume 2
 "A House Is Not a Home" – Dionne Warwick
 "Bad Romance" – Lady Gaga
 "Beautiful" – Christina Aguilera
 "Beth" – KISS
 "Dream a Little Dream of Me" – The Mamas & the Papas
 "Dream On" – Aerosmith
 "Gives You Hell" – The All-American Rejects
 "Good Vibrations" – Marky Mark and the Funky Bunch featuring Loleatta Holloway
 "Hello, I Love You" – The Doors
 "Ice Ice Baby" – Vanilla Ice
 "Jessie's Girl" – Rick Springfield
 "Like a Virgin" – Madonna
 "Over the Rainbow" – Israel Kamakawiwo'ole
 "Pink Houses" – John Mellencamp
 "Shout It Out Loud" – KISS
 "The Boy Is Mine" – Brandy and Monica
 "The Lady Is a Tramp" – Sammy Davis, Jr.
 "To Sir, with Love" – Lulu
 "Total Eclipse of the Heart" – Bonnie Tyler
 "U Can't Touch This" – MC Hammer

Glee Karaoke Revolution: Volume 3
 indicates Downloadable Song (Xbox360 Version Only)
 "Back to Black" – Amy Winehouse
 "Billionaire" – Travie McCoy featuring Bruno Mars
 "Blame It (On the Alcohol)" – Jamie Foxx featuring T-Pain
 "Born This Way" – Lady Gaga
 "Don't Go Breaking My Heart" – Elton John and Kiki Dee
 "Fat Bottomed Girls" – Queen
 "Friday" – Rebecca Black
 "Go Your Own Way" – Fleetwood Mac
 "I Don't Want to Know" – Fleetwood Mac
 "I Follow Rivers" – Lykke Li
 "I Know What Boys Like" – The Waitresses
 "I Look to You" – Whitney Houston
 "I Want to Hold Your Hand" – The Beatles
 "I've Gotta Be Me" – Sammy Davis, Jr.
 "(I've Had) The Time of My Life" – Bill Medley and Jennifer Warnes
 "Just the Way You Are" – Bruno Mars
 "Last Christmas" – Wham!
 "Loser like Me"
 "Losing My Religion" – R.E.M.
 "Lucky" – Jason Mraz and Colbie Caillat
 "Marry You" – Bruno Mars
 "Never Going Back Again" – Fleetwood Mac
 "One of Us" – Joan Osborne
 "Only the Good Die Young" – Billy Joel
 "Papa Can You Hear Me?" – Barbra Streisand *
 "P.Y.T. (Pretty Young Thing)" – Michael Jackson
 "River Deep - Mountain High" – Ike and Tina Turner
 "Somebody to Love" – Justin Bieber
 "Songbird" – Fleetwood Mac
 "Stop! In the Name of Love/Free Your Mind" – Diana Ross & the Supremes/En Vogue
 "Sway" – Michael Bublé
 "The Time Warp" – The Rocky Horror Show
 "Valerie" – Mark Ronson featuring Amy Winehouse

Karaoke Revolution Presents: American Idol (NTSC)
Note: Italics denotes a "locked" song, requiring certain requirements to be met in order to be accessed.

 "All My Life" – K-Ci & JoJo
 "Alone" – Heart
 "Always Something There to Remind Me" – Naked Eyes
 "Be Without You" – Mary J. Blige
 "Breakaway" – Kelly Clarkson
 "Build Me Up Buttercup" – The Foundations
 "Can't Help Falling in Love" – Elvis Presley
 "Crazy Little Thing Called Love" – Queen
 "Dilemma" – Nelly & Kelly Rowland
 "Do I Make You Proud" – Taylor Hicks
 "Don't Let the Sun Go Down on Me" – Elton John
 "Don't You Want Me" – The Human League
 "Easy" – Commodores
 "Every Rose Has Its Thorn" – Poison
 "Flying Without Wings" – Ruben Studdard
 "Heartbreaker" – Pat Benatar
 "Heaven" – Los Lonely Boys
 "Hungry Like the Wolf" – Duran Duran
 "If You Don't Know Me By Now" – Simply Red
 "It's Not Unusual" – Tom Jones
 "Just Once" - James Ingram
 "Just the Way You Are" – Billy Joel
 "Let's Stay Together" – Al Green
 "Love Will Keep Us Together" – Captain & Tennille
 "More Than Words" – Extreme
 "Photograph" – Nickelback
 "Piano Man" – Billy Joel
 "Proud Mary" – Creedence Clearwater Revival
 "Rock with You" – Michael Jackson
 "Saving All My Love For You" – Whitney Houston
 "She Bangs" – Ricky Martin
 "Stand By Me" – Ben E. King
 "Stickwitu" – The Pussycat Dolls
 "Straight Up" – Paula Abdul
 "Sugar, We're Goin' Down" – Fall Out Boy
 "The Real Thing" – Bo Bice
 "Total Eclipse of the Heart" – Bonnie Tyler
 "Unwritten" – Natasha Bedingfield
 "What a Girl Wants" – Christina Aguilera
 "You and Me" – Lifehouse
 "You've Lost That Lovin' Feelin'" – The Righteous Brothers

Karaoke Revolution Presents: American Idol Encore (on PlayStation 2, PlayStation 3, Xbox 360, and Wii)

On-disc song list
Note: Italics denotes a "locked" song, requiring certain requirements to be met in order to be accessed.
 "Black Hole Sun" – Soundgarden
 "Black Velvet" – Alannah Myles
 "Bohemian Rhapsody" – Queen
 "Close My Eyes Forever" – Ozzy Osbourne and Lita Ford
 "Come Sail Away" – Styx
 "Copacabana" – Barry Manilow
 "Glamorous" – Fergie and Ludacris
 "Heart of Glass" – Blondie
 "Hemorrhage (In My Hands)" – Fuel
 "Holiday" – Madonna
 "How to Save a Life" – The Fray
 "(I Can't Get No) Satisfaction" – The Rolling Stones
 "I Don't Want to Miss a Thing" – Aerosmith
 "(I Just) Died in Your Arms" – Cutting Crew
 "In the Air Tonight" – Phil Collins
 "Irreplaceable" – Beyoncé Knowles
 "It Ends Tonight" – All American Rejects
 "It's Still Rock and Roll to Me" – Billy Joel
 "Knockin' on Heaven's Door" – Guns N' Roses
 "Lips of an Angel" – Hinder
 "Midnight Train to Georgia" – Gladys Knight & the Pips
 "More Than a Feeling" – Boston (5 platinums)
 "My Cherie Amour" – Stevie Wonder
 "My Heart Will Go On" – Celine Dion
 "Over the Rainbow" – Katharine McPhee (15 platinums)
 "Put Your Records On"- Corinne Bailey Rae
 "Rio" – Duran Duran
 "September" – Earth, Wind & Fire
 "Sister Christian" – Night Ranger
 "Sweet Dreams (Are Made of This)" – Eurythmics
 "Tainted Love#Soft Cell versionTainted Love" – Soft Cell
 "These Words" – Natasha Bedingfield
 "Time of the Season" – The Zombies
 "Tiny Dancer" – Elton John
 "Too Little Too Late" – JoJo
 "Unfaithful" – Rihanna
 "Walking On Sunshine" – Katrina and the Waves
 "What is Love?" – Haddaway (10 platinums)
 "You Can't Hurry Love" – Diana Ross and The Supremes
 "You're Beautiful" – James Blunt

Exclusive downloads for the PlayStation 3 and Xbox 360 versions
Downloadable songs for the Xbox 360 version were first made available on February 22, 2008. More were added later.  Forty-one of these songs were also made available for the PlayStation 3 on March 27, 2008, with more following later. So far, all of the available songs are from previous games in the series, including the first Karaoke Revolution: American Idol game. As of May 14, 2008, there were no more new downloadable songs for this game. The rest of the new songs would continue to be available for the sequel Karaoke Revolution Presents: American Idol Encore 2.

Karaoke Revolution Presents: American Idol Encore 2 (on PlayStation 3, Xbox 360, and Wii)

On-disc song list
Note: Italics denotes a "locked" song, requiring certain requirements to be met in order to be accessed.

Exactly the same version of "Crazy in Love" was used in Karaoke Revolution: Party. It replaced the song "Makes Me Wonder."

Exclusive downloads for the PlayStation 3 and Xbox 360 versions only
All downloadable songs for Karaoke Revolution Presents American Idol Encore (see list above) are imported to the PlayStation 3 and Xbox 360 versions of Karaoke Revolution Presents: American Idol Encore 2. For players who do not own Karaoke Revolution Presents: American Idol Encore, the downloadable songs can be purchased from either the PlayStation Store (PlayStation 3 owners), Xbox Live Marketplace (Xbox 360 owners) or the in-game "Downloadable Content" store.

Brand New PlayStation 3 and Xbox 360 downloadable songs
This is the complete finalized list of the new downloadable songs are available for both PlayStation 3 and Xbox 360 version of Karaoke Revolution Presents: American Idol Encore 2. Some of the downloadable songs were from the previous Karaoke Revolution Presents: American Idol Encore. All items are listed per the official PlayStation Store website and the official Xbox LIVE Marketplace website. On March 2, 2009, the downloadable song "Black Velvet" was released for the Xbox 360 version and it is misdownloaded as the song "Hemorrhage (In My Hands)". This problem was fixed on March 6, 2009. Recently, Konami released 5 downloadable rock songs in their original versions found from their other musical game Rock Revolution; however, as of mid-April 2009, 4 of those songs were no longer available from the Xbox Live Marketplace for undisclosed reasons. "The Joker And The Thief" is the only downloadable song remaining for the Xbox 360. The PlayStation 3 still remains available to purchase all 5 of the new downloadable songs. As of March 31, 2009, there will permanently be no more new downloadable songs for this game as the Karaoke Revolution series has seen the last of its cover versions. With the new rebooted version of Karaoke Revolution coming out, all will be master recordings and new downloadable songs for that version will also be master recordings. On June 2, 2009, the PlayStation 3 version's downloadable songs "Heartbreaker" and "I Don't Want To Miss A Thing" were no longer available in the PlayStation Store.

Karaoke Revolution (2009) (on PlayStation 3, Xbox 360, and Wii)

Xbox version
The Xbox version of Karaoke Revolution has some changes, and is not the same as Karaoke Revolution Party for Xbox.

The Xbox version has 50 songs that come with the game. "One Week", "Science Genius Girl", and "This Old Heart of Mine (Is Weak For You)" are unlockable songs.

The songlist is made up of 36 songs from KR1 on the PS2, 10 Motown songs not from previous Karaoke Revolution games, and 4 songs from KR2 on the PS2.

 "Addicted" – Simple Plan
 "All You Wanted" – Michelle Branch
 "Are You Happy Now?" – Michelle Branch
 "Believe" – Cher
 "Billie Jean" – Michael Jackson
 "Bizarre Love Triangle" – New Order
 "Broken Wings" – Mr. Mister
 "Celebration" – Kool & the Gang
 "Chain of Fools" – Aretha Franklin
 "Complicated" – Avril Lavigne
 "Crawling in the Dark" – Hoobastank
 "Don't Know Why" – Norah Jones
 "Every Morning" – Sugar Ray
 "Everything You Want" – Vertical Horizon
 "Girls Just Want To Have Fun" – Cyndi Lauper
 "Heartbreak Hotel" – Elvis Presley
 "Hey Jealousy" – Gin Blossoms
 "Hit Me With Your Best Shot" – Pat Benatar
 "Hot Stuff" – Donna Summer
 "How You Remind Me" – Nickelback
 "I Can't Help Myself (Sugar Pie, Honey Bunch)" – The Four Tops
 "I Heard It Through the Grapevine" – Marvin Gaye
 "I Want You Back" – The Jackson 5
 "I'll Be There" – The Jackson 5
 "I'm Coming Out" – Diana Ross
 "It's the End of the World as We Know It (and I Feel Fine)" – R.E.M.
 "I've Got You Under My Skin" – Frank Sinatra
 "Just My Imagination"- The Temptations
 "Kiss Me" – Sixpence None the Richer
 "Ladies' Night" – Kool & The Gang
 "Like a Virgin" – Madonna
 "One Week" – Barenaked Ladies
 "Please Mr. Postman" – The Marvelettes
 "Red Red Wine" – UB40
 "Save Tonight" – Eagle Eye Cherry
 "Science Genius Girl" – Freezepop
 "She Talks to Angels" – Black Crowes
 "Smooth Criminal" – Michael Jackson
 "Son of a Preacher Man" – Dusty Springfield
 "Stop! In the Name of Love" – Diana Ross & The Supremes
 "The Power of Love" – Huey Lewis and the News
 "The Tracks of My Tears" – Smokey Robinson & The Miracles
 "This Old Heart of Mine (Is Weak For You)" – The Isley Brothers
 "Waiting for Tonight" – Jennifer Lopez
 "We Are Family" – Sister Sledge
 "What Becomes of the Broken Hearted" – Jimmy Ruffin
 "When a Man Loves a Woman" – Percy Sledge
 "Wind Beneath My Wings" – Bette Midler
 "You Really Got Me" – Van Halen
 "You're the One That I Want" – Olivia Newton-John

The 10 Motown songs on the Xbox version
These songs use the original Motown recordings. (Some of them have to be unlocked)

 I Can't Help Myself (Sugar Pie, Honey Bunch) – Four Tops
 I Heard It Through the Grapevine – Marvin Gaye
 I Want You Back – The Jackson 5
 I'll Be There – The Jackson 5
 Just My Imagination (Running Away with Me) – The Temptations
 Please Mr. Postman – The Marvelettes
 Stop! In the Name of Love – Diana Ross & the Supremes
 The Tracks of My Tears – Smokey Robinson & the Miracles
 This Old Heart of Mine (Is Weak For You) – The Isley Brothers
 What Becomes of the Brokenhearted – Jimmy Ruffin

Xbox Live Downloads for Karaoke Revolution and Karaoke Revolution Party
Xbox Live online in-game content downloads allow users to 'download' new tracks for the Xbox releases of Karaoke Revolution and Karaoke Revolution Party. These songs are included on the Karaoke Revolution Party disk in a hidden format, and are unlocked through Xbox Live. It is also possible to manually unlock tracks on Development Xboxes and modded Xboxes.

All song packs except XRXB1 (The free bonus pack) are US$4.99. All 20 songpacks are also sold together in the "XRXM1: MegaPack" for $79.99.

KRX01: Classic Rock:
"Born to be Wild", "Every Breath You Take", "Rock and Roll All Night", "Sweet Home Alabama", and "The Joker".

KRX02: Modern Rock:
"Here Without You", "I Believe in a Thing Called Love", "I Hate Everything About You", "It's My Life", and "Perfect".

KRX03: Pop:
"Cry", "Miss You", "Papa Don't Preach", "The First Cut is the Deepest", and "White Flag".

KRX04: Top 40:
"... Baby One More Time", "Genie in a Bottle", "I'm With You", "Irresistible", and "Toxic".

KRX05: Classics:
"Drift Away", "Let's Get It On", "My Girl", "Rich Girl", and "(Sittin' On) The Dock of the Bay".

KRX06: Mix:
"Friends in Low Places", "I Will Survive", "Lady Marmalade", "I'll Make Love to You", "Virtual Insanity", and "Jessie's Girl".

KRX07: Sing and Dance:
"Beat It", "Don't You (Forget About Me)", "Flashdance...What a Feeling", "Oops!...I Did It Again", "Twist and Shout"

KRX08: Duets:
"Ain't No Mountain High Enough", "California Dreaming", "I Got You Babe", "Respect", "Under Pressure"

KRX09: Modern Rock 2:
"Hold On", "Meant to Live", "Someday", "The Reason", "When I'm Gone"

KRX10: Top 40 2:
"Come Clean", "My Immortal", "Leave (Get Out)", "Thank You", "Why Can't I"

KRX11: Soul and R&B:
"ABC", "Burn", "If I Ain't Got You", "Killing Me Softly", "Shining Star"

XRX12: Pop 2:
"Against All Odds", "Careless Whisper", "Love Shack", "Take My Breath Away", "You're the One that I Want"

KRX13: Classics 2:
"China Grove", "In the Midnight Hour", "Joy to the World", "New York New York", "Unchained Melody"

KRX14: Hard Rock:
"Crawling in the Dark", "Hit Me With Your Best Shot", "How You Remind Me", "She Talks to Angels", "You Really Got Me"

KRX15: 80s Pop:
"Billie Jean", "Broken Wings", "Girls Just Want to Have Fun", "Like a Virgin", "The Power of Love"

KRX16: 70s Disco:
"Celebration", "Hot Stuff", "I'm Coming Out", "Ladies Night", "We Are Family"

KRX17: Classics 3:
"Chain of Fools", "Heartbreak Hotel", "I've Got You Under My Skin", "Son of a Preacher Man", "When a Man Loves a Woman"

KRX18: Mix 2:
"Bizarre Love Triangle", "It's the End of the World As We Know It", "Kiss Me", "One Week", "Wind Beneath My Wings"

KRX19: Modern Rock 3:
"Addicted", "Every Morning", "Everything You Want", "Hey Jealousy", "Save Tonight"

KRX20: Top 40 3:
"All You Wanted", "Are You Happy Now?", "Believe", "Complicated", "Don't Know Why", "Waiting For Tonight"

XRXB1: Free Bonus Pack: "Science Genius Girl", "Snake Eater", "Waiting For You"

Song Lists – Japan
With at least nine volumes of J-Pop Best alone, as well as several themed releases, there are many more expansions of this game available in Japan compared to North America.

Including the song lists shown below, there are also two children's / family-themed releases, Karaoke Revolution Kazoku Idol Sengen and Karaoke Revolution Kids Song Selection.

Karaoke Revolution J-Pop Best Collection Volume 1
 "Ano hikouki kumori sora watte" – 19
 "Boyfriend" – aiko
 "Sakura no toki" – aiko
 "Every Heart -minna no kimochi-" – BoA
 "Jewel Song" – BoA
 "Tentai Kansoku" – Bump of Chicken
 "You Go Your Way" – Chemistry
 "Kimi o sagashiteta -New Jersey United-" – Chemistry
 "Hi no Ataru Sakamichi" – Do As Infinity
 "Kuchibashi ni Cherry" – EGO-WRAPPIN'
 "Winter, again" – Glay
 "Rocket Dive" – hide with Spread Beaver
 "Samurai Drive" – hitomi
 "Sobakasu" – Judy and Mary
 "Nemurenu yoru wa kimi no sei" – Misia
 "Ai suru hana" – Mongol 800
 "Na mo naki uta" – Mr. Children
 "Hero" – Mr. Children
 "One" – Rip SLYME
 "Linda Linda" – The Blue Hearts
 "Jōnetsu no Bara" – The Blue Hearts
 "Secret Base -Kimi ga kureta mono-" – ZONE
 "Ikiteru kototte subarashii" – Kuzu
 "Single Bed" – Sharam Q
 "Sora mo toberu hazu" – Spitz
 "Cherry" – Spitz
 "Love Machine" – Morning Musume
 "Koko ni iru zee" – Morning Musume
 "Sakura -dokushou-" – Moriyama Naotaro
 "Friends" – Rebecca
 "Taisetsu na mono" – Road of Major
 "Colors" – Hikaru Utada
 "First Love" – Hikaru Utada
 "Sign" – Onitsuka Chihiro
 "Lifetime Respect" – Miki Dozan
 "Koi ni ochite (Fall in Love)" – Kobayashi Akiko
 "Kaze no rarara" – Kuraki Mai
 "Will" – Nakashima Mika
 "Tonbo" – Nagabuchi Tsuyoshi
 "Itsu no hi ni ka" – Shimatani Hitomi
 "Oh My Little Girl" – Ozaki Yutaka
 "Love -Destiny-" – Ayumi Hamasaki
 "Appears" – Ayumi Hamasaki
 "Seasons" – Ayumi Hamasaki
 "M" – Ayumi Hamasaki
 "July 1st" – Ayumi Hamasaki
 "Hanabi" – Ayumi Hamasaki
 "Voyage" – Ayumi Hamasaki
 "Everywhere Nowhere" – Ayumi Hamasaki
 "Heartplace" – Ayumi Hamasaki

Karaoke Revolution J-Pop Best Collection Volume 2
 "Kabutomushi" – aiko
 "Listen to My Heart" – BoA
 "It Takes Two" – Chemistry
 "Solid Dream" – Chemistry
 "My Faith" – day after tomorrow
 "Fantasista" – Dragon Ash
 "Mirai yosouzu II" – Dreams Come True
 "Fragile" – Every Little Thing
 "song for you" – EXILE
 "Kiss you" – EXILE
 "Zutto futari de" – Glay
 "Haru o ai suru hito" – Glay
 "Way of Difference" – Glay
 "Moshimo kimi ga nakunaraba" – Going Steady
 "Chiisana koi no uta" – Mongol 800
 "Youthful Days" – Mr. Children
 "Rakuen Baby" – Rip SLYME
 "White Love" – Speed
 "Train-Train" – The Blue Hearts
 "Towa ni" – The Gospellers
 "Kaze" – Kobukuro
 "Tsunami" – Southern All Stars
 "Saboten no hana" – Tulip
 "Mugen" – Porno Graffitti
 "The Peace" – Morning Musume
 "Natsuiro" – Yuzu
 "Can You Celebrate" – Amuro Namie
 "Shounen Jidai" – Inoue Yosui
 "Automatic" – Hikaru Utada
 "I'm Proud" – Kahala Tomomi
 "Touch" – Yoshimi Iwasaki
 "Gekko" – Onitsuka Chihiro
 "Wadatsumi no ki" – Hajime Chitose
 "For You..." – Takahashi Mariko
 "Momoiro toiki" – Takahashi Mariko
 "Gomen ne..." – Takahashi Mariko
 "Pride" – Imai Miki
 "Anata no kisu o kazoemashou -You Were Mine-" – Koyanagi Yuki
 "Yeah! Meccha Holiday" – Matsuura Aya
 "Chijo no hoshi" – Nakajima Miyuki
 "True Love" – Fujii Fumiya
 "I Love You" – Ozaki Yutaka
 "Evolution" – Ayumi Hamasaki
 "Who ..." – Ayumi Hamasaki
 "We Wish" – Ayumi Hamasaki
 "Real Me" – Ayumi Hamasaki
 "A Song is Born" – Ayumi Hamasaki & keiko
 "Squall" – Fukuyama Masaharu
 "Life Is ...: Another Story" – Ken Hirai
 "Boku no namae o yonda ato ni" – Makihara Noriyuki

Karaoke Revolution J-Pop Best Collection Volume 3
 "Sakura" – 175R
 "Sora ni utaeba" – 175R
 "Cho" – B-DASH
 "Valenti" – BoA
 "Pieces of a Dream" – Chemistry
 "Kimi o sagashiteta -The Wedding Song-" – Chemistry
 "Grateful Days" – Dragon Ash
 "Time Goes By" – Every Little Thing
 "Unspeakable" – Every Little Thing
 "Tears" – Fayray
 "Koi no uta" – Go! Go! 7188
 "Ginga tetsudou no yoru" – Going Steady
 "Nanimo ienakute ... natsu" – Jaywalk
 "Over Drive" – Judy and Mary
 "The Perfect Vision" – Minmi
 "Everything" – Misia
 "Ryūkyū Love Song" – Mongol 800
 "Mujun no ue ni saku hana" – Mongol 800
 "Dakishimetai" – Mr. Children
 "Innocent World" – Mr. Children
 "Tomorrow Never Knows" – Mr. Children
 "Ima o dakishimete" – Noa
 "Tsuki no shizuku" – Rui
 "Yozora no mukou" – SMAP
 "Sekai ni hitotsu dake no hana" – SMAP
 "Jam" – The Yellow Monkey
 "Moonlight" – Kuzu
 "Tomodachi" – Ketsumeishi
 "Kachofugetsu" – Ketsumeishi
 "Shall We Love?" – Gomattō
 "Seishun" – The High-Lows
 "Itoshi no Eri" – Southern All Stars
 "Do It! Now" – Morning Musume
 "Itsuka" – Yuzu
 "Koi no kayoubi" – Yuzu
 "Say the Word" – Amuro Namie
 "I Will" – Amuro Namie
 "Wishing on the Same Star" – Amuro Namie
 "Wine Red no kokoro" – Anzen Chitai
 "Traveling" – Hikaru Utada
 "Get Along Together" – Yamane Yasuhiro
 "Good Bye Natsuo" – Matsuura Aya
 "Anata ni aitakute ~Missing You~" – Matsuda Seiko
 "Stars" – Nakashima Mika
 "Aishiteru" – Nakashima Mika
 "A Song for xx" – Ayumi Hamasaki
 "I Am ..." – Ayumi Hamasaki
 "Sakurazaka" – Fukuyama Masaharu
 "Ookina furudokei" – Ken Hirai
 "One Night Carnival" – Kishidan

Karaoke Revolution J-Pop Best Collection Volume 4
 "Alone" – B'z
 "Heiwajima" – B-DASH
 "Point of No Return" – Chemistry
 "if..." – Da Pump
 "Shinjitsu no Uta" – Do As Infinity
 "Life Goes On" – Dragon Ash
 "Kioku" – Every Little Thing
 "However" – Glay
 "Hello" – Hyde
 "Garasu no shounen" – Kinki Kids
 "Solitude ~Shinjitsu no sayonara" – Kinki Kids
 "Mirai e" – Kiroro
 "Best Friend" – Kiroro
 "Anata ni" – Mongol 800
 "Don't Worry Be Happy" – Mongol 800
 "Tsukiakari no shita de" – Mongol 800
 "Any" – Mr. Children
 "Hello, Again -Mukashi kara aru basho-" – My Little Lover
 "Orange" – SMAP
 "Lion Heart" – SMAP
 "Invoke" – T.M. Revolution
 "Aozora" – The Blue Hearts
 "Hito ni yasashiku" – The Blue Hearts
 "Road" – The Toraburyu
 "ding-dong" – TOKIO
 "Natsumatsuri" – Whiteberry
 "Amairo no kami no otome" – The Village Singers
 "Mugibatake" – Oyones
 "Manatsu no kajitsu" – Southern All Stars
 "Robinson" – Spitz
 "Saga-ken" – Hanawa
 "Saudade" – Porno Graffitti
 "Agehachou" – Porno Graffiti
 "Morai naki" – Hitoto Yo
 "Sakura Drops" – Hikaru Utada
 "Naminori Johnny" – Kuwata Keisuke
 "Shiroi koibitotachi" – Kuwata Keisuke
 "Be Alive" – Koyanagi Yuki
 "Momoiro kataomoi" – Matsuura Aya
 "The Bigaku" – Matsuura Aya
 "Hana" – Ishimine Satoko
 "Kanpai" – Nagabuchi Tsuyoshi
 "Amairo no kami no otome" – Shimatani Hitomi
 "Genki o dashite" – Shimatani Hitomi
 "Ai ga umareta hi" – Fujitani Miwako & Ōuchi Yoshiaki
 "Dearest" – Ayumi Hamasaki
 "Mou hitotsu no doyoubi" – Hamada Shougo
 "Kimi ga iru dake de" – Komekome Club
 "Roman hikou" – Komekome Club
 "Lonely Chaplin" – Suzuki Kiyomi with Rats & Star

Karaoke Revolution Love & Ballad
 "Mirai yosouzu II" – Dreams Come True
 "Thank You" – Dreams Come True
 "Love Love Love" – Dreams Come True
 "However" – Glay
 "Mou kimi igai aisenai" – Kinki Kids
 "Nagai aida" – Kiroro
 "These Days" – Love Psychedelico
 "Everything" – Misia
 "Hana / tori / kaze / tsuki" – Misia
 "Over" – Mr. Children
 "Owarinaki tabi" – Mr. Children
 "Yasashii uta" – Mr. Children
 "Dareka no kimochi o kangaeta koto ga arimasu ka?" – Siam Shade
 "Lion Heart" – SMAP
 "My Graduation" – Speed
 "Hanashitaku wa nai" – T-BOLAN
 "Linda" – Ann Lewis
 "Sayonara" – Off Course
 "Bye Bye My Love" – Southern All Stars
 "Kaede" – Spitz
 "Say Yes" – Chage and Aska
 "Saudade" – Porno Graffitti
 "Love Machine" – Morning Musume
 "Dekkai uchuu ni ai ga aru" – Morning Musume
 "Can You Celebrate" – Amuro Namie
 "Kanashimi wa tomaranai" – Anri
 "Tomorrow" – Okamoto Mayo
 "Suki ni natte, yokatta" – Kato Izumi
 "Sayonara daisuki na hito" – Hana*bana
 "La La La Love Song" – Toshinobu Kubota with Naomi Campbell
 "for you..." – Takahashi Mariko
 "Cosmos" – Yamaguchi Momoe
 "Ii hi tabidachi" – Yamaguchi Momoe
 "Get Along Together" – Yamane Yasuhiro
 "Love Story wa totsuzen ni" – Oda Yasumasa
 "Hello, my friend" – Matsutoya Yumi
 "Watashi ga oba-san ni nattemo" – Moritaka Chisato
 "Wakaremashou watashi kara kiemashou anata kara" – Oguro Maki
 "Genki dashite" – Oguro Maki
 "Aitai" – Sawada Chikako
 "Genki o dashite" – Takeuchi Mariya
 "You're My Only Shinin' Star" – Nakayama Miho
 "Sekaichuu no dare yori kitto" – Nakayama Miho & Wands
 "True Love" – Fujii Fumiya
 "I Love You" – Ozaki Yutaka
 "Dearest" – Ayumi Hamasaki
 "Seasons" – Ayumi Hamasaki
 "End Roll" – Ayumi Hamasaki
 "Far Away" – Ayumi Hamasaki
 "Kanashimi wa yuki no you ni" – Hamada Shougo

Karaoke Revolution Night Selection 2003
Unlike most variations of Karaoke Revolution which offer modern and classic pop songs, the Night Selection 2003 focuses primarily on traditional genres such as enka.

 "Hana no yukimushi" – Kim Yonja
 "Tokyo Twilight" – Cheuni
 "Tsugunai" – Teresa Teng
 "Toki no nagare ni mi o makase" – Teresa Teng
 "Wakare no yokan" – Teresa Teng
 "Aijin" – Teresa Teng
 "Osaka bojou" – Nagai Miyuki
 "Aishuu Sanbashi" – Nagai Yuko
 "Nadeshiko" – Ryo Kamon
 "Sake yo" – Ikuzo Yoshi
 "Yukiguni" – Ikuzo Yoshi
 "Konya wa hanasanai" – Hashi Yukio & Abe Ritsuko
 "Awayuki no hashi" – Kagami Gorou
 "Tsugaru no hana" – Harada Yuri
 "Nagaragawa enka" – Itsuki Hiroshi
 "Izakaya" – Itsuki Hiroshi & Kinomi Nana
 "Haguresou" – Kouzai Kaori
 "Amerikabashi" – Yamakawa Yutaka
 "Hana mo arashi mo" – Yamamoto Joji
 "Tojinbo" – Mizumori Kaori
 "Aman" – Sugawara Yoichi & Silvia
 "Hagure Kokiriko" – Naruse Shohei
 "Koi no machi Sapporo" – Ishihara Yujiro
 "Yogiri yo konya mo arigatou" – Ishihara Yujiro
 "Kita no tabibito" – Ishihara Yujiro
 "Amagigoe" – Ishikawa Sayuri
 "Tsugaru ga ikyou / Fuyugeshiki" – Ishikawa Sayuri
 "Kibune no yado" – Kawanaka Miyuki
 "Nirinsou" – Kawanaka Miyuki & Gen Tetsuya
 "Shinanogawa" – Takigawa Maiko
 "Kokoro no eki" – Otsuki Miyako
 "Sazanka no yado" – Okawa Eisaku
 "Mago" – Oizumi Itsuro
 "Kawachi otoko bushi" – Nakamura Mitsuko
 "Kyoudai-bune" – Toba Ichiro
 "Chindo monogatari" – Tendo Yoshimi
 "Haru ga kita" – Tendo Yoshimi
 "Anta no hanamichi" – Tendo Yoshimi
 "Futari no Osaka" – Miyako Harumi & Miyazaki Masashi
 "Kawa no nagare no yō ni" – Misora Hibari
 "Midaregami" – Misora Hibari
 "Kiyoshi no zundokobushi" – Hikawa Kiyoshi
 "Hoshizora no Akiko" – Hikawa Kiyoshi
 "Kita kuukou" – Hama Keisuke & Kye Eun-Sook
 "Sotto oyasumi" – Fuse Akira
 "Tomari ki no machi" – Hattori Yukiko
 "Hashi" – Kitajima Saburo
 "Kita no sakaba" – Kitajima Saburo
 "Nora" – Kadokura Yuki
 "Okuhida bojo" – Ryu Tetsuya

Karaoke Revolution Anime Song Selection
Another variation on the franchise's theme is the, which, contrary to its name, often includes themes for tokusatsu shows such as Ninpuu Sentai Hurricanger and several Kamen Rider series. This selection predominantly features shows from the 1970s and 1980s, with a few exceptions in the opening tracks.

 "Odoru ponpokorin" – B.B. Queens – from Chibi Maruko-chan
 "Moonlight densetsu" – DALI – from Sailor Moon
 "Dance! Ojamajo" – MAHO-dou – from Ojamajo Doremi
 "Pegasus Fantasy" – MAKE-UP – from Saint Seiya
 "1/3 no junjou na kanjou" – Siam Shade – from Rurouni Kenshin
 "Invoke" – T.M. Revolution – from Mobile Suit Gundam SEED
 "Tensai Bakabon" – Idol Four – from Tensai Bakabon
 "Mahoutsukai Sally" – Hiroko Asakawa – from Sally, the Witch
 "Hajimete no chuu" – Anshin Baba – from Kiteretsu Daihyakka
 "Cat's Eye" – Anri – from Cat's Eye
 "Dokonjogaeru" – Susumu Ishikawa & Arakawa Boys and Girls Choir – from Dokonjo Gaeru
 "Obake no Q-taro" – Susumu Ishikawa – from Obake no Q-taro
 "Kamen Rider Agito" – Shinichi Ishihara – from Kamen Rider Agito (live-action)
 "Kimi o nosete" – Azumi Inoue – from Castle in the Sky
 "Tonari no Totoro" – Azumi Inoue – from My Neighbor Totoro
 "Sazae-san" – Yuko Uno – from Sazae-san
 "Cha-La Head-Cha-La" – Hironobu Kageyama – from Dragon Ball Z
 "8 Man no uta" – Shigeru Katsumi – from 8 Man
 "Ge Ge Ge no Kitaro" – Ichiro Kumakura – from GeGeGe no Kitaro
 "Ai o torimodose!!" (also known as "YOU wa SHOCK!") – Crystal King – from Fist of the North Star
 "Ginga tetsudou 999" – Godaigo – from Galaxy Express 999
 "Attack No. 1" – Kurumi Kobato & Kumiko Osugi – from Attack No. 1
 "Uchuu senkan Yamato" – Isao Sasaki & Royal Knights – from Space Battleship Yamato
 "Tatakae! Casshan" – Isao Sasaki – from Casshern
 "Ginga tetsudou 999" – Isao Sasaki & Suginami Children's Choir – from Galaxy Express 999
 "Itoshisa to setsunasa to kokoro tsuyosa to" – Ryoko Shinohara with t.komuro – from Street Fighter II: The Animated Movie
 "Gatchaman no uta" – Masato Shimon – from Science Ninja Team Gatchaman
 "Hurricanger sanjou!" – Hideaki Takatori – from Ninpuu Sentai Hurricanger (live-action)
 "Makafushigi Adventure" – Hiroki Takahashi – from Dragon Ball
 "Kamen Rider Kuuga" – Masayuki Tanaka – from Kamen Rider Kuuga (live-action)
 "Lupin sansei sono 2" – Charlie Kosei – from Lupin III
 "Yume o shinjite" – Hideaki Tokunaga – from Dragon Quest: Dai no Daibouken
 "Devilman no uta" – Keizo Tsujita & Vocal Shop – from Devilman
 "Anpanman no March" – Dreaming – from Soreike! Anpanman
 "Yuukirinrin" – Dreaming – from Soreike! Anpanman
 "Anpanman Taisou" – Dreaming – from Soreike! Anpanman
 "Minashigo no Ballad" – Hiroshi Nitta – from Tiger Mask
 "Hamtaro tottoko uta" – Ham-chans – from Hamtaro
 "Te o tsunagou" – Ham-chans – from Hamtaro
 "Umi no Triton" – Hide Yuki & Suginami Children's Choir – from Umi no Triton
 "Candy Candy" – Mitsuko Horie – from Candy Candy
 "Cutey Honey" – Yoko Maekawa – from Cutey Honey
 "Hyokkori hyoutanjima" – Yoko Maekawa – from Cutey Honey
 "Yasashisa ni tsutsumareta nara" – Yumi Arai – from Kiki's Delivery Service
 "Mazinger Z" – Ichiro Mizuki – from Mazinger Z
 "Babel nisei" – Ichiro Mizuki & Columbia Cradle Club – from Babel II
 "Bokura no Mazinger Z" – Ichiro Mizuki & Columbia Cradle Club – from Mazinger Z
 "Ultra Seven no uta" – Misuzu Children's Choir & The Echoes – from Ultra Seven (live-action)
 "Tatakae! Kamen Rider V3" – Hiroshi Miyauchi & The Swingers – from Kamen Rider V3 (live-action)
 "Mononoke Hime" – Yoshikazu Mera – from Princess Mononoke

References

Karaoke Revolution